The Conrad Prebys Performing Arts Center, also known as The Conrad, is a concert hall located in La Jolla, California. It was opened in April 2019 and serves as the permanent residence of the La Jolla Music Society.

History 
Since 1986, the La Jolla Music Society (LJMS) rented the Museum of Contemporary Art San Diego's Sherwood Auditorium throughout their concert seasons and well as their SummerFest. In 2012, the LJMS learned of the museum's plans to demolish Sherwood Auditorium. In May 2014, the LJMS purchased a 30,760-square-foot parcel of land worth $10 million in La Jolla Village using $50 million in funds from eleven donors including $15 million from Conrad Prebys. With increased funds, construction of The Conrad began on February 1, 2017. The opening concert on April 5, 2019, featured performances by Hilary Hahn, Jean-Yves Thibaudet, Jake Shimabukuro, Lil Buck, the Miró Quartet, Inon Barnatan, Heiichiro Ohyama, Cho-liang Lin, David Finckel, and Wu Han.

Venue 
The Conrad was built and designed by New England-based Epstein Joslin Architects Inc. and the hall acoustics were managed by Yasuhisa Toyota, president of Nagata Acoustics. Underneath the complex is a $1 million dollar "bathtub" which collects rainwater to prevent flooding.

Baker-Baum Concert Hall 
The concert hall is named after Brenda Baker and Steve Baum who gifted $10 million to the La Jolla Music Society. The hall has a capacity of 513 with oak, eucalyptus, and cedar woods and the stage has many customization options including a pit.

The JAI 
The 140-seat theater is named after Joan and Irwin M. Jacobs who also gifted $10 million. If guests are seated at tables, the venue is estimated to have a capacity of 116 but if guests are left standing, the estimated capacity is around 300. The space is used primarily for jazz, experimental music, and other amplified performances.

References

External links 

 La Jolla Music Society
 Official website

2019 establishments in California
Concert halls in California
Culture of San Diego
Buildings and structures in San Diego
Tourist attractions in San Diego County, California
Music venues completed in 2019
Performing arts centers in California
Music venues in California